Bochovice is a municipality and village in Třebíč District in the Vysočina Region of the Czech Republic. It has about 100 inhabitants.

Administrative parts
The village of Batouchovice is an administrative part of Bochovice.

References

Villages in Třebíč District